Silverball is a 1993 pinball video game developed by Digital Extremes and Epic MegaGames and published by MicroLeague. It is basically a set of Epic Pinball tables distributed through retail. Silverball was the first set of pinball games created by James Schmalz and paved the way for the development of Epic Pinball.

Tables
The shareware version included the "Fantasy" table and nonplayable versions of "Blood", "Snooker Champ", and "Odyssey" in which the plunger does not work. There are also two tables which appear in the later released Silverball Plus 2, as well a bonus table that could be ordered for free when purchasing Silverball directly from Epic MegaGames.

Reception
Computer Gaming World stated that "the ball's action is a bit strange", behaving like rubber instead of steel. The magazine concluded that "Silverball ranks high for those who don't mind the unrealistic ball action".

References

External links

List of past games from Digital Extremes

1993 video games
DOS games
DOS-only games
Epic Games games
MicroLeague games
Multiplayer and single-player video games
Multiplayer hotseat games
Pinball video games
Team17 games
Video games developed in Canada